Paweł Kowalewski - (born September 20, 1958 in Warsaw) is a Polish artist, member of Gruppa, pedagogue, founder of the Communication Unlimited agency.

Biography 

From 1978 to 1983 he studied at the Academy of Fine Arts in Warsaw, where he received a diploma with distinction from the studio of Stefan Gierowski. Since 1985 he has been a lecturer at the Department of Design of the Warsaw Academy of Fine Arts. Currently he holds the academic title of professor of the Academy. He was a founder member of Gruppa, the most famous artistic grouping in Poland in the 1980s, together with Ryszard Grzyb, Jarosław Modzelewski, Włodzimierz Pawlak, Marek Sobczyk and Ryszard Woźniak. Gruppa's works can be summarised as being a rebellion against an overly academic approach to art and a taking of a post avantgarde position, as well as being a protest against the censorship and repression meted out by the communist state during the time of martial law which had been introduced in 1981 throughout Poland.

The reality of this difficult period in the history of the People's Republic of Poland (PRL) was felt by Kowalewski primarily in terms of the absurd and grotesque. From 1984 to 1989, in Gruppa's short-lived journal “Oj dobrze już (Oh, It's Good Now)” amongst verses, commentaries, sketches and drawings, Kowalewski wrote humorous texts using the pseudonym of an imaginary American journalist Sharm Yarn. He wanted in this way to show up the lack of confidence in traditional Polish art criticism, comment on the lack of engagement with the unique phenomena which were happening in Poland during this time as well as make fun of attempts to set forced directions for culture based on political paradigms set from above.

Creative output 

Kowalewski's work comes from the post conceptual tradition, where the idea of the artist mixes with his work using the form of written commentaries and the poetic often complex titles of the works which are placed on sashes made of material. Together with the other members of Gruppa, he organised radical happenings with joint painting and recitals, based on poetic absurdity, in, amongst other places the cult studio “Dziekanka” at the Warsaw Academy of Fine Arts (e.g. recital in 1987,” A Cold Deer in Jam” about Lenin in Poronin. Kowalewski's art can be described as being expressionist, autobiographical, inspired by personal experience and literary context. As an artist he created his own communicative language. More important than form or medium for him was the message.

In Poland during the 1980s there was a characteristic meeting of social and artistic paths, which were taken by artists who were researching that reality while examining moral and ideological values. The work of Kowalewski and Gruppa was created in parallel with and perhaps even earlier than some of the trends which were then happening in German art, such as Neue Wilde. Rebellion and a search for identity determined the approach of artists then in both countries.

Concept of personal art 

From the first years of his artistic career Paweł Kowalewski developed the concept of “personal art, that is private”. Artistic inspiration therefore was closely connected to the artist's own life, while also at the same time it also referred to problems which were of a more universal nature. This basic oscillation between the individual experience and universality has accompanied Kowalewski's work up till today and reflects a consistent theme.

Around 1986 the first of Kowalewski's sculptures came into being. Small objects, which the artist closed in glass cases, as if they were relicts from the past. “Prawe ucho sługi najwyższego Kapłana/The Right Ear Serves the Highiest Priest” and “Kamień, który stał się chlebem/The Stone which Became Bread” were critical commentaries on the hostile everyday aesthetic of the time. In a similarly brutal, expressive and nonchalant tone Kowalewski created his paintings which were even the subject of censorship interventions from the Catholic Church. The artist's work in the 1980s was treated by the authorities of what was then a totalitarian state as art which must stay outside official circulation. The series “Psalmy/Psalms” which was inspired by the Psalm of David as translated by Czesław Miłosz, was subjectively accused of blasphemy. Each of these works by Kowalewski referred to specific quotations from this book of psalms and reflected the dilemmas of a young artist: Should I leave or stay in my country? What is right? Is there justice...?

The crowning moment of this period was the artist's participation in Documenta 8. in Kassel in 1987, where works by amongst others Barbara Kruger and Joseph Beuys were exhibited. Kowalewski together with Gruppa organised a joint painting happening on a large size canvas called, “Kuda Gierman”.

After many exhibitions both nationally and abroad some of Kowalewski's works became in later times icons of 1980s art, e.g. “Mon Cheri Bolsheviq” (a painting exhibited in amongst other places the Tretyakov Gallery in Moscow), the sculpture “Tragiczna nieprzezroczystość konieczności/A Tragic Opaque Necessity” (a hermetically sealed aquarium with a piece of beef kidney submerged in water) or “Do widzenia moi kochani/Goodbye, My Beloved Ones” (a painting which is part of the private collection of the well-regarded art critic Anda Rottenberg).

Breakthrough time 

A key transformative moment in Kowalewski's work came in 1989, when the artist together with other members of Gruppa initiated a joint painting gathering in front of the capital city's Solidarity polling station. This gathering called "Głos przyrody na Solidarność" as known as "Voice of Nature on Solidarity” was a symbolic closing moment of the group's career. The artists had started in the 1980s as novices, and had finished the decade as classics. Thanks to their many artistic successes, in 1992 in the Zachęta National Art Gallery there was a large retrospective exhibition, which showed a significant cross-section of Gruppa's work. The country's systemic transformation and also the end of the Gruppa's existence, affected Kowalewski's work by changing its means of communication. At the beginning of the 90s he started to create analytical and structural canvasses. In his paintings from this period the artist's work portrayed a clash of nineteenth century wall paper patterns with black and white stripes – a sarcastic vision of the future. After exhibiting his latest series called „Fin de siècle” in the Warsaw gallery Appendix in 1992, Paweł Kowalewski was taken on by the French gallery of Isy Brachot, as the only Pole apart from Roman Opałka. His work was then shown in the Brachot gallery in Brussels, together with a retrospective of one of Belgium's most famous artists, the surrealist Paul Delvaux.
Kowalewski concluded his artistic work in the medium of painting with the „Fin de siècle” series. From this moment he concentrated on inter-disciplinary and performance art. During this period the artist created his most characteristically socially engaged work as an artist. The sign “Europeans Only”, seen in the Apartheid Museum in Johannesburg in 2010 initiated the series “Forbidden/NIE WOLNO” which took the form of a documentation of all the bans and orders which the artist registered during his travels all over the world. Reproductions of the “NIE WOLNO” series in the form of postcards appeared during Kowalewski's artistic performances during the Biennale in Venice in 2011. The artist visited souvenir stands and added his cards with the regulatory orders of both democratic and totalitarian systems to the standard tourist ones which were normally displayed. “NIE WOLNO” also functioned as a series of light boxes which accompanied the installation “Totalitarianism Simulator” in Propaganda Gallery in 2012. In this technical machine built by the artist, the world of oppression and drastic images of the crimes committed during totalitarian times, were presented next to scenes from a normal everyday life (e.g. barman competition in Italy, a family out for a walk in Milan, a classical music concert). The viewer on entering the simulator became a participant in the tragic events, because his photo which was registered on entry to the cabin, was randomly placed on the projected filmed frames of horror. The materials used to produce the “Totalitarianism Simulator”, the smell of rubber, smelly tar, the darkness and isolation, brought the viewer closer to a situation associated with oppression, so that each individual could become aware of his reactions and behaviour during the simulation of a moment of danger.

New beginning 
The 2000s for Kowalewski brought a turn towards the ethos of memory or the personal process of forgetting and erasing. In 2015 in Tel Aviv the artist presented the series "Strength and Beauty" in which he concentrated on issues connected to subjective memory in the context of group experience.

The concept was inspired by a very personal history of the artist and became a pretext to tell the stories of an extraordinary generation of women. A series of large format portraits which disappeared, presented so called “Polish Mothers” who had been affected by the trauma of war and totalitarianism. Thanks to a special printing technique, the women's portraits after some time were barely visible, just as their images fade in our memories. Kowalewski while working on the series "Strength and Beauty" conduced an artistic dialogue with the well-known Israeli artist Dan Reisinger.
In 2017 Paweł Kowalewski had his own solo exhibition in the prestigious Jerke Museum, the first foreign institution in Germany which is mainly dedicated to Polish avant-garde art. The “Zeitgeist”<ref>{{Cite web|url=http://www.museumjerke.com/termine/recklinghausen-leuchtet/|title=Recklinghausen leuchtet - Museum Jerke Jerke Art Foundation gGmbH|website=Museum Jerke Jerke Art Foundation gGmbH|language=de|access-date=2019-03-08}}</ref> project was made up of sculptures and the best-known paintings from the 1980s, amongst others “Ja zastrzelony przez Indian/I, Shot Dead by the Indians”. As a part of the exhibition, at the same time in St. Peter's Church in Recklinghausen, Kowalewski's large format works were exhibited, so the Psalms of David, which even today have retained their universal character, as they deal with issues related to how to shape individual autonomy when faced with higher powers. He also stars in the movie "Power of Art" realized by the Jerke Museum and the Film School in Łódź.

 Collections and exhibitions 

Paweł Kowalewski's works are to be found in the biggest Polish museums, but also in the Paris Centre Pompidou, as well as many Polish and foreign private collections. His work has been bought for the National Museum of Warsaw collection, the National Museum of Kraków, Zachęta – National Art Gallery, Museum Jerke, the Regional Museum in Bydgoszcz, the Museum of Upper Silesia in Bytom, the collection of the Academy of Fine Arts in Warsaw, and also the ING Polish Art Foundation, the Benetton Foundation, the Starak Family Foundation and the Egit Foundation. They are also to be found in the private collections of Andrzej Bonarski, Donald Pirie, Cartier, Jan Zylber and the Paszkowski Estate Norblin.

Paweł Kowalewski's work has also been exhibited in amongst other places the Jerke Museum in Germany, Artist's House in Tel Aviv, the Tretyakov Gallery in Moscow, the Isy Brachot gallery in Brussels, in Dorotheum in Vienna, Sotheby's in London, NS-Dokumentationszentrum in Munich, Zachęta - National Art Gallery in Warsaw, the Museum of the History of Photography in Kraków, MOCAK, the Warsaw Gallery Propaganda (formerly Appendix) as well as at art fairs in Vienna, Brussels and Stockholm.

The artist has also taken part in important retrospective exhibitions summarising the time of the Polish transformation and political relations in Poland up to and after 1989, e.g. “Banana Revolution”, “Moscow – Warsaw”, “Irreligion" and “The Fatherland in Art”.

 Auction market 

The painting by Paweł Kowalewski “Why is There Something Rather than Nothing?” from 1986, it was the first NFT object to be sold at a Polish live art auction. The pioneering event for the domestic art market, took place on December 2, 2021 at DESA Unicum. The artist's work that has been tragically damaged, now passes to eternity in a digital form.

 Professional life 
In 1991 he set up his own advertising agency “Communication Unlimited”.

 Solo exhibitions 
	1984 - Woe Betide, A. M. Sobczyk Atelier, Warsaw
	1984 - Bad Omen, Mała Galeria ZPAF, Warsaw
	1984 - Mad Hammer, Dziekanka Atelier, Warsaw
	1986 - Satan's Day, Gallery "Na Ostrowie", Wrocław
	1987 - Recital, Dziekanka Atelier, Warsaw
	1987 - STK, Łódź
	1987 - Mandala Theatre, Cracow
	1989 - Paweł Sosnowski Gallery, Warsaw
	1990 - Everything & At Once, SARP Pavilion, Warsaw
	1990 - Ariadne Galleries, Vienna
	1991 - Paintings and Ready Mades, Polish Cultural Centre, Prague
	1991-92 - Turn of the Century, Gallery Appendix, Warsaw
	1992 - Office of Art Exhibitions, Sandomierz
	1992 - Isy Brachot Gallery, Brussels
	1993 - Stockholm Art Fair
	1993 - Brussels Art Fair
	2008 - I, Shot Dead by the Indians for the Second Time, Gallery Appendix2, Warsaw
	2010 - NOT ALLOWED!, 2. Mediations Biennale, Poznań
 2012 - Totalitarianism Simulator, Gallery Propaganda, Warsaw 
 2013 - Totalitarianism Simulator, MCSW Elektrownia, Radom 
 2015 - Strength and Beauty, The Artists House, Tel Aviv
2016 - These Things Now, Gallery Propaganda, Warsaw 
 2017 - Strength and Beauty, Museum of Photography, Cracow
 2017 - Zeitgeist, Museum Jerke, Recklinghausen
 2017 - Why is There Nothing rather Than Something?, Miejski Ośrodek Sztuki, Gorzów Wielkopolski
2019 - All Life is Art, Przestrzeń dla Sztuki S2, Warsaw
2021 - Objects Created to Stimulate the Life of the Mind; The Invisible Eye of the Soul, Gallery of Contemporary Art WINDA, Kielce

 Group exhibitions 

	1984 - Chaos, Man, Absolute, Church of the Visitation of the Blessed Virgin Mary, Warsaw
	1985 - Brought to Account, Gallery Forma, Warsaw
	1985 - Against Evil, against Violence, churches: Mistrzejowice, Podkowa Leśna, Zielonka
	1985 - Presence, Parish of Divine Mercy, Warsaw
	1985 - 1st Biennale Road and Truth, Holy Cross Church, Wrocław
	1985 - Time of Sadness, Time of Hope, Church of Our Lady of Sorrows, Poznań
	1985 - 1st Biennale of New Art, Zielona Góra
	1986 - Records 2, Office of Art Exhibitions, Lublin
	1986 - Expression of the 80s., Office of Art Exhibitions, Sopot
	1986 - Polish Pieta, churches: Poznań, Wrocław
	1986 - Testimony of Togetherness, Museum of the Warsaw Archdiocese, Warsaw
	1987 - Mystery of the Passion, Death and Resurrection of Jesus Christ, Museum of the Warsaw Archdiocese, Warsaw
	1987 - 2nd Biennale Road & Truth, Church of the Holy Cross, Wrocław
	1987 - What's Up?, Former Norblin Factory, Warsaw
	1988 - In the image and Likeness. New Religious Expression, Former Norblin Factory, Warsaw
	1989 - Feelings, Gallery Dziekanka, Warsaw
	1989 - Pole. German. Russian., Former Norblin Factory, Warsaw
	1990 - 1990 – Artists for the Republic, Gallery Studio, Warsaw
	1990 - Summer Salon, National Museum, Cracow
	1990 - Kunst des 20 jahrhunderts aus Mittel und Osteuropa, Dorotheum, Vienna
	1991 - Sketch for the Contemporary Art Gallery, National Museum, Warsaw
	1991 - What Good is an Artist in Times of Misery, Zachęta National Gallery of Art, Warsaw; National Museum, Cracow
	1991 - Artistic Confrontations, Old Town Hall, Toruń
	2001 - Run of the Reds, Gallery Zderzak, Cracow
2002 - Irreligion, Atelier 340 Museum, Brussels, Belgium
	2003 - Children, Artists, Harlots and Businessmen, Gallery Program, Warsaw
	2003 - Obligation and Revolt. The Academy of Fine Arts in Warsaw 1944-2004, Zachęta National Gallery of Art, Warsaw
	2004/05 - Warsaw - Moscow/ Moscow - Warsaw 1900-2000, Zachęta National Gallery of Art, Warsaw; Tretyakov State Gallery, Moscow.
	2006 - In Poland, Meaning Where?, Centre for Contemporary Art, Warsaw
	2007 - Humour and the Power to Think (Asteism in Poland), Centre for Contemporary Art, Warsaw; Łaźnia Centre for Contemporary Art, Gdańsk
	2007 - Image of Life, Museum of the Origins of the Polish State, Gniezno
	2007 - Poisoned Source. Contemporary Polish Art in the Post-romantic Landscape, National Museum, Szczecin; Latvian National Arts Museum.
	2008 - Banana Republic. Expression of the 80s., Office of Art Exhibitions Wałbrzych; National Museum, Szczecin; Gallery Wozownia, Toruń; City Gallery Arsenał, Poznań; Łaźnia Centre for Contemporary Art, Gdańsk
	2009 - Like a Rolling Stone, Centre of Polish Sculpture, Orońsko; (Like a Rolling Stone 2) Gallery Appendix2, Warsaw
	2009-10 - Banana Republic. Expression of the 80s., MODEM Centre for Modern and Contemporary Arts, Debrecen
	2010 - 18. battle which Changed the Fate of the World, Pavilion at the Parade Square, Warsaw
	2010-11 - Generation 1980. Independent Works of the Young in the Years 1980-1989, National Museum, Cracow
 2011 - Big Boys Games, Gallery Appendix2, Warsaw 
 2011 - Preview, Gallery Propaganda, Warsaw
 2013 - Blue The Most Beautiful Colour In The World, Gallery Propaganda, Warsaw 
 2013 - Small is Big, Gallery Propaganda, Warsaw 
 2014 - Between Seasons, Gallery Propaganda, Warsaw
 2016 - Collections, Zachęta - National Art Gallery, Warsaw
 2016 -  À la Flamande, Propaganda, Warsaw
 2016 - Viennacontemporary, Marx-Halle, Vienna
 2018 - Place of the Artist Kordegarda Gallery of the National Center for Culture, Warsaw
 2018 - Homeland in Art, 'MOCAK' Museum of Contemporary Art, Cracow
2019 - Collections, Zachęta – National Art Gallery and Centre of Polish Sculpture in Orońsko, National Forum of Music, Wrocław
2019 - Magmatism Pic-Nic, Chiesa dei Santi Cosma e Damiano, Venice, Italy
2019 - Time, Gdańska Galeria Miejska, Gdańsk, Poland
2019 - New Figuration- New Expression, DESA Unicum , Warsaw, Poland
2019 - My Name is Red, Państwowa Galeria Sztuki, Sopot, Poland
2019 - Tropical Craze, Propaganda, Warsaw Gallery Weekend, Warsaw, Poland
2019 - II World War – Drama, Symbol, Trauma,  Museum of Modern Art , Cracow, Poland
2019 - Tell Me about Yesterday Tomorrow, Munich Documentation Centre for the History of National Socialism, Munich, Germany
2019 - Antimonuments, Józef Brandt's Palace, Center of Polish Sculpture, Orońsko
2019 - The Spirit of Nature and Other Fairy Tales. 20 years of the ING Polish Art Foundation, Silesian Museum, Katowice
2021 - Sculpture in a Search of a Place - Zachęta – National Gallery of Art, Warsaw
2021 - A.B.O. THEATRON. L’Arte o la Vita / Art or Life – Achille Bonito Oliva, Castello di Rivoli Museo d’Arte Contemporanea, Turin
2021 - *** TOWARDS FREEDOM. Polish Art of the 1980s. and 1990s. from the Collection of Werner Jerke, Państwowa Galeria Sztuki, Sopot
2021 - Us and Dogs, Dogs and Us, Państwowa Galeria Sztuki, Sopot
2022 - Exercises from Art. Collection of the Museum of the Academy of Fine Arts in Warsaw, Czapski Palace, Warsaw

 Exhibitions and events by Gruppa 

	1983 - Forest, Hill and Cloud above the Hill, Dziekanka Atelier, Warsaw; Office of Art Exhibitions, Lublin
	1984 - Premier's Mother, Chamber Theatre, Warsaw
	1984 - A Woman Running off with Butter, Dziekanka Atelier, Warsaw
	1985 - Lifting the Curtain on the Secrets of Traditional Painter's Atelier, Dziekanka Atelier, Warsaw (1st event)
	1985 - Art of Admiration, Gallery SHS, Warsaw
	1985 - How to Help Kryszkowski?, Strych, Łódź
	1985 - Only Tonight Darling, Office of Art Exhibitions, Lublin
	1985 - Rypajamawłoszard Grzykomopasoźniak Wkład w wykład vel Idź wylicz, Dziekanka Atelier, Warsaw (2nd event) 
	1985 - Who Can See This Radius Vector?, Gallery Wieża, Warsaw
	1985 - Gold of the Economy, Incense of Art, Bitter Myrrh of Politics, Parish of Divine Mercy, Warsaw
	1985 - Song and Dance Ensemble of the Polish People's Republic, Dziekanka Atelier, Warsaw (3rd event)
	1986 - You Rabble, Boredom which Brings Bad Luck is Your Hero, Gallery Wielka 19, Poznań
	1986 - Sluggish Youth Sings, Stuffy Maid Whirls, Dziekanka Atelier, Warsaw (4th event)
	1987 - Gruppa Gruppen, Gallery Atrium, Stockholm
	1987 - Avanguardia polacca esposizione dell'arte indipendente polacca, Centro Direzionale Colleoni, Agrate Brianza near Milan
	1987 - Kuda Gierman, Gruppenkunswerke, Kassel
	1988 - The Drawing on Site, Gallery Obraz, Poznań
	1988 - Artist in a Temple of Words About Art, Gallery "Na Ostrowie", Wrocław
	1988 - They Interfere Animals with Spitting Out Objects Taken Into Their Snouts, Gallery DESA „Nowy Świat”, Warsaw
	1988 - Cathedral of Painting, Gallery Dziekanka, Warsaw (5th event)
	1988 - Ars Aura Prior, Gallery DESA „Stary Rynek”, Poznań
	1988 - Gruppa – Documents, Gallery Pokaz, Warsaw
	1989 - The Dungeons of Manhattan, Łódź
	1989 - Woyzeck. (Shacks? We've Got Our Own), Studio Theatre, Łódź
	1991 - Gruppa – 6 Good Mistakes, Dziekanka Atelier, Warsaw
	1992 - Gruppa 1982-1991, Zachęta National Gallery of Art, Warsaw
	2002 - We Confess Guilt, Ask for Forgiveness and Promise Improvement, Program Art Gallery, Warsaw
       2013 - Oh, It's All Right Now'', Gallery Propaganda, Warsaw

References 

1958 births
Living people
Academy of Fine Arts in Warsaw alumni
20th-century Polish painters
20th-century Polish male artists
21st-century Polish painters
21st-century male artists
Polish male painters